Wilfred Miller Vincent Koch (29 October 1862 – 28 August 1939) was a British surgeon and member of the Legislative Council of Hong Kong.

Biography
Koch was born on 29 October 1862 in Jaffna, Ceylon, son of Edwin Lawson Koch, descendant of Godfried Koch of Brandenburg Prussia and a respected doctor in Ceylon. Koch Sr. died suddenly in 1877 and the Ceylon public offered subscription to pay W. V. M. Koch's medical education in Britain. He was educated in St. Thomas' College, Ceylon and then graduated from the University of Edinburgh with an MB ChB in 1884 and MD in 1895.

After graduation worked as a medical officer in various hospitals in London and Sheffield from 1884 to 1888. In 1889, he joined the Colonial Medical Services and was sent to Trinidad between 1889 and 1903. He was an Army Major in command of the Trinidad Artillery.

Koch moved to Hong Kong in 1903 as a government doctor. In 1914, he was promoted to Superintendent of the Government Civil Hospital until he began his private practice in 1917. He was the Vice-President of the British Medical Association, Hong Kong Branch in 1907 to 1908. He was also a District Surgeon of the St John Ambulance Overseas Brigade. He was hired as lecturer in Surgery of the Hong Kong College of Medicine for Chinese which turned into the Medical Faculty of the University of Hong Kong in 1912. He was in the University Senate in 1912 and continued as a lecturer of the University until 1917.

He was member of the Sanitary Board from 1920 to 1931. He was appointed to the Legislative Council of Hong Kong in 1926 and Licensing Board in 1927.

He married three times first to Ida Nathan, then Ellen Elliot Drake Briscoe and finally  Elsie M. Thompson.

References

1862 births
1939 deaths
Academic staff of the University of Hong Kong
Alumni of the University of Edinburgh
British expatriates in Hong Kong
British expatriates in Sri Lanka
British expatriates in Trinidad and Tobago
British surgeons
Hong Kong surgeons
Members of the Legislative Council of Hong Kong
Members of the Sanitary Board of Hong Kong
People from Jaffna
Sri Lankan surgeons